Oostpoort is a neighborhood in the borough Amsterdam-Oost in Amsterdam, Netherlands.

Initially, the area was named Polderweggebied after the Polderweg, which is a road running through it. Between 1885 and 1921, the Oostergasfabriek (Eastern Gas Factory) was located in the area. After the factory was closed, the neighborhood became a business area. In the early 2000s, multiple buildings were demolished and the terrain was remediated. In 2007, the first new buildings were constructed. In 2008, the neighborhood was renamed Oostpoort.

In 2013, Oostpoort had a population of 573. The local government is expecting the population to peak with 2,274 in the year 2020.

The district office of Amsterdam-Oost, a shopping area, one primary school, and two secondary schools are located in Oostpoort.

References

External links 
 

Amsterdam-Oost
Neighbourhoods of Amsterdam